Evan Thomas Jenkins (26 June 1906 – 1990) was a Welsh professional footballer who played as a winger.

References

1906 births
1990 deaths
People from Rhondda
Welsh footballers
Association football midfielders
Lincoln City F.C. players
Burnley F.C. players
Barnsley F.C. players
York City F.C. players
English Football League players